Eva Habil (إيفا هابيل in Arabic) is an Egyptian lawyer. In 2008, she became Egypt's first female mayor when she was appointed mayor of Kom Buha, a town of Upper-Egypt with a population of about 10,000. She was chosen over five male candidates, including her brother.

Habil was born in Kom Buha. Like most of the village residents, she is a Coptic Christian. Her father was the mayor there until 2002. She studied and practiced law in Cairo, and is a member of the National Democratic Party.

References 

Living people
National Democratic Party (Egypt) politicians
Women mayors of places in Egypt
Mayors of places in Egypt
Egyptian people of Coptic descent
Coptic politicians
Year of birth missing (living people)
21st-century Egyptian women politicians
21st-century Egyptian politicians